C-Edge College, is a general degree college located in Naga United Village, Chümoukedima District, Nagaland. It offers undergraduate courses in, arts and management. This college is affiliated to Nagaland University.

Departments

Arts and Management
English 
History 
Political Science 
Sociology
Economics
Education
Management

Accreditation
The college is recognized by the University Grants Commission (UGC).

References

External links
http://cedgecollege.org/web/

Colleges affiliated to Nagaland University
Universities and colleges in Nagaland
Educational institutions in India with year of establishment missing